This is a list of rulers of the Akan state of Akyem Abuakwa.

See also
Ghana
Gold Coast
Lists of incumbents

References

Rulers
Lists of African rulers